To the World & Beyond  is the second studio album by South African DJ Sun-El  Musician, released on December 4, 2020 by EL World Music.

Background 
On November 24, 2020, Sun-El Musician announced his double album release date.

Accolades
To the World & Beyond  was nominated for Best Dance Album, Male Artist of the Year and won Best Live Audio Visual Recording at 27th South African Music Awards.

|-
|rowspan="3"|2021
|rowspan="3"|To the World & Beyond 
| Best Live Audio Visual Recording
|
|-
| Male Artist of the Year
| 
|-
| Best Dance Album 
|

Artwork
The album's artwork features Sun-El Musician upper body, wearing traditional attire. Its background is composed by planets.

Track listing

Commercial performance 
To the World & Beyond garnered over 7.5 million streams on Spotify a day before release.

Release and promotion 
The album standard edition was released on December 4, 2021.

A Journey to the World & Beyond (Uhuru Space Force) Virtual Concert was released an hour before the album release.

"Ubomi Abumanga" featuring South African singer Msaki was released as second single and accompanying music video on May 28, 2020.

"Never Never" featuring South African singer Nobuhle was released as third single on December 3, 2021.

Release history

References 

2020 albums
Sun-El Musician albums
EL World Music albums